The Ministry of Business, Innovation and Employment (MBIE) is the public service department of New Zealand charged with "delivering policy, services, advice and regulation" which contribute to New Zealand's economic productivity and business growth.

History
Formed on 1 July 2012, MBIE is a merger of the Department of Building and Housing (DBH), the Department of Labour (DoL), the Ministry of Economic Development (MED), and the Ministry of Science and Innovation (MSI).

The Ministry was responsible for the Pike River Recovery Agency from 31 January 2018 to 1 July 2022.

In October 2018, the newly created Ministry of Housing and Urban Development (HUD) assumed several of MBIE's housing policy, funding and regulatory functions including the KiwiBuild programme, the Community Housing Regulatory Authority, and administration of funding for the HomeStart, Welcome Home Loans, the legacy Social Housing Fund and Community Group Housing programmes.

On 14 July 2020, the Ministry assumed responsibility for running the New Zealand Government's COVID-19 managed isolation and quarantine (MIQ) programme. The last four MIQ facilities closed in June 2022.

Structure
Senior Leadership
 Chief Executive and Secretary (Ministry of Business, Innovation and Employment)
 Deputy Secretary – Immigration
 Deputy Secretary – Data, Digital and Insights
 Deputy Secretary – Building, Resources and Markets
 Deputy Secretary – Labour, Science and Enterprise
 Deputy Secretary – Te Waka Pūtahitanga
 Deputy Secretary – Te Whakatairanga Service Delivery
 Deputy Secretary – Ngā Pou o te Taumaru
 Head of Kānoa – Regional Economic Development and Investment Unit
 Chief Financial Officer 
 Chief Advisor to the Secretary

Operational functions
The Ministry manages a number of operational services, including:
 Business.govt.nz
 Companies Office, which also manages registers for:
 motor-vehicle traders
 financial-service providers
 societies and trusts
 personal-property securities
 Consumer Affairs (formerly the Ministry of Consumer Affairs)
 Electricity Authority
 Electrical Workers Registration Board
Employment New Zealand
 Government procurement
 Immigration New Zealand
 Intellectual Property Office of New Zealand
 Major events
 Māori Economic Development, including partnership with the independent Māori Economic Development Panel and partnering in He kai kei aku ringa (HKKAR – providing the food you need with your own hands) – the Māori Economic Development Strategy and Action Plan
 Insolvency and Trustee Service
 Natural Hazards Research Platform (NHRP)
 New Zealand Cycle Trail
 New Zealand Petroleum & Minerals
 New Zealand Space Agency
 Radio Spectrum Management
 Strategic Science Investment Fund (SSIF)
 Vision Mātauranga (indigenous knowledge policy)

Monitoring functions 
The ministry is the monitor of the following Crown entities, Crown research institutes, statutory boards and non-listed companies.

Ministers
The Ministry serves 20 portfolios and 16 ministers.

References

External links
 

New Zealand Public Service departments
Science and technology in New Zealand